Alpha Corvi (α Corvi, abbreviated Alpha Crv, α Crv), also named Alchiba , is an F-type main-sequence star and the fifth-brightest star in the constellation of Corvus. Based on parallax measurements made during the Hipparcos mission, it is approximately 49 light-years from the Sun.

Nomenclature
α Corvi (Latinised to Alpha Corvi) is the star's Bayer designation.

It bore the traditional names Al Chiba (Arabic ألخبا al-xibā "tent") and Al Minliar al Ghurab (Arabic منقار الغراب al-manxar al-ghurab) or Minkar al Ghurab. The latter appeared in the catalogue of stars in the Calendarium of Al Achsasi al Mouakket, which was translated into Latin as Rostrum Corvi (beak of the crow). In 2016, the International Astronomical Union organized a Working Group on Star Names (WGSN) to catalogue and standardize proper names for stars. The WGSN approved the name Alchiba for this star on 12 September 2016 and it is now so included in the List of IAU-approved Star Names.

In Chinese astronomy, Alchiba is called 右轄, Pinyin: Yòuxiá, meaning Right Linchpin, because it stands alone in the Right Linchpin asterism, Chariot mansion (see: Chinese constellations), 右轄 (Yòuxiá), westernized into Yew Hea by R.H. Allen.

Namesake

 is a former United States Navy ship.

Properties
Alchiba belongs to the spectral class F1V and has apparent magnitude +4.00. This star exhibits periodic changes in its spectrum over a three-day period, which suggests it is either a spectroscopic binary or (more likely) a pulsating Gamma Doradus-type variable.

Alpha Corvi has a common proper motion companion, named Alpha Corvi B, located about 3.1 arcsec away. It is a red dwarf with a spectral type of M4V.

See also
List of nearest bright stars

References

External links
 Alpha Corvi by Professor Jim Kaler.

Corvus (constellation)
Corvi, Alpha
Alchiba
F-type main-sequence stars
Corvi, 01
059199
4623
105452
CD-24 10174
Spectroscopic binaries
Gamma Doradus variables
Gliese and GJ objects